Kryvoruchko or Krivoruchko (Ukrainian or Russian: Криворучко) is a gender-neutral Ukrainian surname. It may refer to:
Aleksandr Krivoruchko (born 1984), Russian football player
Nikolai Krivoruchko (1887–1938), Russian and Soviet soldier
Orest Kryvoruchko (1942–2021), Ukrainian artist
Svitlana Kryvoruchko (born 1975), Ukrainian journalist
Yuriy Kryvoruchko (born 1986), Ukrainian chess grandmaster
Yuriy Kryvoruchko (politician) (born 1966), Ukrainian politician

See also
 
 

Ukrainian-language surnames